Madhuri Chattopadhyay (16 December 1940 – 19 October 2013) was a Bengali  singer from Kolkata, who sang numerous songs in popular Bengali language during the 1960s, 70s and 80s.  Madhuri Chattopadhyay will forever be remembered for her contribution in Geet, Gazal, Bengali Modern Songs, light Classical songs, Najrul Geeti and Rabindra Sangeet. She was playback singer for a few Bengali movies. She also published album in Shyama Sangeet in later years.

Family members
Father: Shibnath Bandyopadhyay

Husband: Arun Kumar Chattopadhyay

Daughter: Rupa Chattopadhyay

Early life
According to the accounts of Shankarlal Bhattacharya, Madhuri was born in a nursing home in Park Street, and was raised in her maternal uncle's house in Balaram Bose Ghat Road in North Kolkata in her early years. Her father Sri Shibnath Bandyopadhyay was a famous Kirtaniya (Kirtan Singer), and the main inspiration behind her. Since her early years Madhuri was trained in Hindusthani Classical Music under eminent artists such as Singer Uma De, Ustad Keramatullah Khan and Pandit Harihar Shuklaji. Apart from her father, she was trained in Kirtan from eminent singer Sri Rathin Ghosh.

Career as a Singer
Madhuri appeared in the audition in All India Radio in 1955 and started her career as a singer at the age of fourteen. In 1959 she was offered to publish her first record from Megaphone as Puja album. Music for the two songs were composed by Nachiketa Ghosh. "Oli omon kore noy" and "Tomay amay prothom dekha", these two songs became legends on their first appearance and created a permanent place in the romantic psyche of Bengalis. In the first disk her name was mentioned as Madhuri Bandyopadhyay.

Madhuri Chattopadhyay was introduced to Salil Chowdhury by Sri Kamal Ghosh, owner of Megaphone Records. in 1960 Madhuri published her Puja Album with two songs composed by Salil Chowdhury, "Nijere haraye khuNji" and "Ebar amar somoy holo jabar".

Madhuri sang a few songs of Salil Chowdhury. Salilda while composing "Oi je sobuj bono bithika" that spans two and a half octave, used glimpses of Beethoven's 6th symphony (Pastorale) in the interlude, that blended with Madhuri's voice.

For many years she resided at the Dover Lane Reserve Bank Quarters, and was closely associated with the local cultural activities.

Playback singer in Bengali movies
Maestro Rathin Ghosh was Guru of Madhuri Chattopadhyay and under his music direction Madhuri appeared as playback singer in the Bengali movie "Moha Teertha Kalighat" in 1964. It was a chorus song sang along with Nilima Bandopadhyay, Binay Adhikary and Manas Mukhopadhyay. In the same year she sang in Bengali movie "Radhakrishna". In 1965 she sang in "Rup Sanatan" a kirtan. Manabendra Mukhopadhyay gave her a break in the movie "Uttor Purush" in 1966. The song "ekbar broje chalo Brajeswar" became immense popular. Other Movies where she lent her voice were "Shachimar Sonsar" (1971), "Swarnaa Mahal" (1982), "Tania" (1987) etc.

Events, Memoirs
Pratima Bandopadhyay presented Sundar Narayan Bandyopadhyay Smriti Sandhya on July 13, 2010 at 6 pm  at Vidya Mandir hall. Madhuri Chattopadhyay was felicitated on that occasion for her lifetime achievement. In spite of her unmatched talent and her outstanding renditions, Madhuri Chattopadhyay kept herself away from the spotlight of media and publicity.

Discography

Awards
Srimati Madhuri Chattopadhyay was awarded with "Sangeet Samman" by Government of West Bengal in 2012.

References

Citations

1940 births
2013 deaths
Bengali playback singers
Singers from Kolkata
Indian women playback singers
20th-century Indian singers
Women musicians from West Bengal
20th-century Indian women singers